Acadie  may refer to:
 Acadia, French name for the former French colony today comprising roughly the Canadian provinces of Nova Scotia, New Brunswick, and Prince Edward Island
 Acadie (album), the debut album by record producer and singer-songwriter Daniel Lanois
 Acadie–Bathurst, a federal electoral district in New Brunswick, Canada
 Acadie (electoral district), a provincial electoral district in Quebec, Canada
 Acadie (Montreal Metro), a station on the Blue Line of the Montreal Metro rapid transit system
 Acadie Siding, New Brunswick, a community in Kent County, New Brunswick, Canada
 Acadie, New Brunswick, a community in Kent County, New Brunswick, Canada
 L'Acadie blanc, a grape variety
 L'Acadie, Quebec, a town in the Montérégie region
 Place d'Acadie, a public square in the 6th arrondissement of Paris

See also
 Acadia (disambiguation)
 Acadieman, a cartoon figure
 Acadieville Parish, New Brunswick